Abrostola clarissa is a species of moth of the family Noctuidae. It is widespread from Turkey to south-western Iran, the Caucasian Region and northern Iraq. In the Levant it is recorded from Syria, Lebanon and Israel.

Adults are on wing from May to June. There is one generation per year.

References

External links 
 Plusiinae of Israel

Plusiinae
Moths of Asia
Moths described in 1900